The 1927–28 British Home Championship was an international football tournament played during the 1927–28 season between the British Home Nations. The competition was won by Wales who did not lose a game and only dropped a single point during the tournament. This championship is most notable for what became known as the "Wembley Wizards" when a scratch Scottish team crushed a highly regarded England side 5–1 at the English national stadium of Wembley. Neither England nor Scotland placed in the top two, something that would not happen again for 56 years, until the final British Home Championship in 1984.

England had endured a dreadful run of form in the years following the First World War, only managing to even share the trophy once in the previous eight years. This trend reached its nadir in 1928, as they began the campaign with a 2–0 defeat to Ireland in Belfast. Wales and Scotland both began well, with a competitive 2–2 draw in Wrexham, Wales following this by defeating England 2–1 in Burnley to take the lead in the competition, a position they made unassailable by beating Ireland by the same scoreline in their final match. Ireland nevertheless still claimed second place by beating the Scots by a single goal in their own final match. In the last game, between England and Scotland at Wembley, Scotland decimated England with powerful attacking football from a team only recently brought together following the defeat to Ireland. This defeat gave England their lowest ELO Rating (1681) in their history.

Table

Results

References 

 1928 British Home Championship 1919-20 to 1938-1939  - dates, results, tables and top scorers at RSSSF

 World Football Elo Ratings: England

1927–28 in English football
1927–28 in Scottish football
Brit7
1928 in British sport
1927-28
1927 in British sport
1927–28 in Northern Ireland association football